Under ytan (French title: Descente aux Enfers, English title: Beneath the Surface) is a 1997 Swedish film directed by Daniel Fridell. A 23-year-old woman has been doing drugs for years and seeks medical treatment. At the clinic, she learns that her boyfriend has recently turned his attention to her younger sister.

The film won Guldbagge Awards in 1998 for best lead actress Johanna Sällström and best cinematography by Jens Fischer. The cinematographer also won 1998 the Camerimage Bronze Frog in Toruń, Poland and also the main award at the Madrid film festival Madridimagen 1998. The director Daniel Fridell was nominated 1998 for the Grand Prix des Amériques at the Montreal World Film Festival.

References

External links 

1997 films
Swedish crime drama films
Films directed by Daniel Fridell
1990s Swedish films